Carphomigma leontodes is a species of moth of the family Tortricidae. It is found in New Guinea.

References

Archipini
Endemic fauna of New Guinea
Moths described in 1953
Moths of New Guinea
Taxa named by Alexey Diakonoff